Victory Christian School  is a private Christian school located in Tulsa, Oklahoma at 7700 South Lewis. The school is co-ed and a Subsidiary program of Victory Christian Center, Inc., a non-denominational Christian church in Tulsa.

History 

Victory Christian School was founded in 1979 by Pastor Billy Joe Daugherty and his wife, Pastor Sharon Daugherty. In 1989, the school moved to its current facilities at 7700 S. Lewis Ave in Tulsa, OK.

Enrollment 

In 1979, 269 students were enrolled in K-6. In 1980, grades 7-12 we added to the school, and the enrollment increased to 422 for K-12. In 1995, enrollment reached 835 in K-12. Enrollment was as an all-time high in 2013 at 1254 in K-12. Since then, enrollment has been steadily decreasing, and is currently at just under 1000 students.

Athletics

Varsity 

 Baseball
 Basketball
 Cheer-leading
 Cross Country
 Football
 Golf
 Soccer
 Tennis
 Track
 Volleyball
Wrestling

Junior High 

 Baseball
 Basketball
 Cheer-leading
 Cross Country
 Football
 Golf
 Tennis
 Track
 Volleyball

Fine Arts

High school 
 Art
 AP Art
 Band
Color guard/Winterguard
Concert Band
Jazz Band
Marching Band
 Choir
One Heart Worship Band
 Drama
 Photography

Middle school 
 Art
 Band
 Choir

Knowledge and the Sciences

High school
 Academic Bowl
 Chess Club
 Robotics

Middle school
 Robotics

References 

 Victory Christian School Official Site
 Victory Conquerors Football
 Victory Christian Band

External links 
 Official website
 Victory Conquerors Football
 Invictus Robotics Team

Christian schools in Oklahoma
Private elementary schools in Oklahoma
Private middle schools in Oklahoma
Nondenominational Christian schools in the United States
Private high schools in Oklahoma
Schools in Tulsa, Oklahoma